Miguel Bañuz Anton (born 26 June 1993) is a Spanish footballer who plays for FC Andorra as a goalkeeper.

Club career

Barcelona B
Born in Elche, Province of Alicante, Valencian Community, Bañuz played youth football for three clubs, spending three years with local Elche CF and finishing his development at FC Barcelona. On 22 December 2012 he made his senior debut with the latter's reserves, taking the place of Oier Olazábal after he was sent off in the last minute of a 4–4 home draw against Girona FC in the Segunda División (he replaced field player Luis Alberto de facto).

On 6 June 2014, Bañuz was released by Barça B after appearing in only five matches.

Villarreal B / Alcoyano
Bañuz joined another reserve team on 2 July 2014, Villarreal CF B of Segunda División B. On 8 August 2016, he signed a one-year contract with fellow league side CD Alcoyano.

References

External links
FC Barcelona official profile

1993 births
Living people
Footballers from Elche
Spanish footballers
Association football goalkeepers
Segunda División players
Segunda División B players
FC Barcelona Atlètic players
Villarreal CF B players
CD Alcoyano footballers
FC Andorra players
Spanish expatriate footballers
Spanish expatriate sportspeople in Andorra
Expatriate footballers in Andorra